This is a chronological list of Tuskegee Airmen Cadet Pilot Graduation Classes from 1942 to 1946.

The Tuskegee Airmen  were a group of primarily African American military pilots (fighter and bomber) and airmen who fought in World War II. They formed the 99th Fighter Squadron, the 332nd Expeditionary Operations Group and the 477th Bombardment Group of the United States Army Air Forces. The name also applies to the navigators, bombardiers, mechanics, instructors, crew chiefs, nurses, cooks and other support personnel.

This list compiles all documented cadet pilot graduates who trained at the Tuskegee Army Air Field, Moton Field, and other locations prior to the U.S. Air Force's deactivation of all-African American Air units. There are 1007 documented Tuskegee Airmen Pilots.

This list includes training in the Tuskegee Aviation Cadet School's three cadet programs:
 Single-Engine Cadet Pilot Class (i.e. trained to fly Bell P-39 Airacobra, Curtiss P-40 Warhawk, Republic P-47 Thunderbolt, North American P-51 Mustang or similar single engine combat fighter aircraft);
 Twin-Engine Cadet Pilot Class (i.e. trained to fly the North American B-25 Mitchell, or
 Liaison Pilot Cadet Class (i.e. training to serve as liaison and service pilots).

This list excludes: 
 Individuals in non-pilot, support operations. 
 Anyone who may have attended the Tuskegee Airmen cadet pilot program but failed to graduate. Such individuals were often pejoratively deemed as "washed out". Some "washed out" cadets were transferred to the 477th Bombardment Group, Tuskegee's "bomber boys". The 477th comprised four squadrons of B-25 Mitchell bombers, stationed at Hondo Army Air Field in Texas. This group did not see combat in World War II. On October 25, 1943, the inaugural group of "washed out" Tuskegee Airmen arrived at Hondo.

Graduating Cadet Class - Single Engine Section - SE-42-C - March 7, 1942
 2nd Lt Lemuel R. Custis
 Captain Benjamin O. Davis Jr.
 2nd Lt Charles DeBow
 2nd Lt George S. Roberts
 2nd Lt Mac Ross

Graduating Cadet Class - Single Engine Section - SE-42-D - April 29, 1942
 2nd Lt Sidney P. Brooks
 2nd Lt Charles W. Dryden
 2nd Lt Clarence C. Jamison

Graduating Cadet Class - Single Engine Section - SE-42-E - May 20, 1942
 2nd Lt James B. Knighten
 2nd Lt George L. Knox II listed as George L. Knox
 2nd Lt Lee Rayford
 2nd Lt Sherman W. White Jr.

Graduating Cadet Class - Single Engine Section - SE-42-F - July 3, 1942
 2nd Lt. Willie Ashley
 2nd Lt. George R. Bolling
 2nd Lt. William A. Campbell (Tuskegee Airman) listed as William A. Campbell
 2nd Lt. Herbert Carter (pilot) listed as Herbert E. Carter
 2nd Lt. Herbert V. Clark
 2nd Lt. Charles B. Hall
 2nd Lt. Allen G. Lane
 2nd Lt. Erwin B. Lawrence Jr.
 2nd Lt. Faythe A. McGinnis
 2nd Lt. Paul G. Mitchell
 2nd Lt. Louis Purnell listed as Louis R. Purnell
 2nd Lt. Graham Smith (Pilot) listed as Graham Smith
 2nd Lt. Spann Watson
 2nd Lt. James T. Wiley

Graduating Cadet Class - Single Engine Section - SE-42-G - August 5, 1942
 2nd Lt Richard C. Davis, killed in action on January 30, 1943.  
 2nd Lt Willie H. Fuller (listed as Willie Fuller). Not to be confused with Flight Officer William A. Fuller Jr. of Single Engine Section Cadet Class SE-45-E, August 4, 1945)
 2nd Lt Cassius C.A. Harris 
 2nd Lt Earl E. King ("Wamba" King), killed in action on March 12, 1943. The Tuskegee Airmen's third ever casualty  
 2nd Lt Walter I. Lawson
 2nd Lt John McClure (pilot) listed as John M. McClure. Actual name is John William McClure
 2nd Lt Leon C. Roberts
 2nd Lt John W. Rogers Sr.

Graduating Cadet Class - Single Engine Section - SE-42-H - September 6, 1942
 2nd Lt Samuel M. Bruce, killed in action January 27, 1944 
 2nd Lt Richard C. Caesar
 2nd Lt Robert W. Deiz
 2nd Lt Joseph Elsberry listed as Joseph D. Elsberry
 2nd Lt Wilmore B. Leonard, known professionally as 'W.B. Leonard'
 2nd Lt James L. McCullin, killed on July 2, 1943. 
 2nd Lt John H. Morgan
 2nd Lt Henry B. Perry
 2nd Lt Edward L. Toppins

Graduating Cadet Class - Single Engine Section - SE-42-I - October 9, 1942
 2nd Lt Nathaniel M. Hill, killed 1943 in a plane crash in thick fog with weather officer and 2nd Lt. Luther L. Blakeney
 2nd Lt Herman A. Lawson
 2nd Lt William T. Mattison, killed January 28, 1951 piloting U.S. Air Force C-45F "Expeditor" #44-87287 in a weather-related crash near Oak Harbor, Ohio.
 2nd Lt Price D. Rice
 2nd Lt Andrew D. Turner

Graduating Cadet Class - Single Engine Section - SE-42-J - November 10, 1942
 2nd Lt Howard Baugh
 2nd Lt Terry J. Charlton Jr. listed as Terry J. Charlton
 2nd Lt Jerome Edwards listed as Jerome T. Edwards
 2nd Lt Melvin T. Jackson

Graduating Cadet Class - Single Engine Section - SE-42-K - December 13, 1942
 2nd Lt Edward C. Gleed
 2nd Lt Milton T. Hall, killed September 18, 1947 when his AT-6 plane collided with another plane during practice exercise.
 2nd Lt Wendell O. Pruitt
 2nd Lt Richard C. Pulliam
 2nd Lt Robert B. Tresville Jr.
 2nd Lt Peter C. Verwayne, killed June 3, 1958 in East Farmingdale, New York in aircraft accident  
 2nd Lt William H. Walker, killed in mid-air collision with 2nd Lt. LeRoi S, Williams on October 14, 1943, near Selfridge Field, Michigan  (This is not accurate, Lt. William H. Walker was not killed in air see foot note number 64) https://www.ilga.gov/legislation/legisnet90/hrgroups/hr/900HR0232LV.html
 2nd Lt Romeo M. Williams

Graduating Cadet Class - Single Engine Section - SE-43-A - January 13, 1943
 2nd Lt Andrew Maples Jr., missing in action June 26, 1944 over the Adriatic Sea while serving in combat with the 301st Fighter Squadron.
 2nd Lt George T. McCrumby, declared dead February 29, 1944 after air crash in the Mediterranean 
 2nd Lt Armour G. McDaniel
 2nd Lt Clinton B. Mills 
 2nd Lt Charles R. Stanton
 2nd Lt Quitman C. Walker, seclared dead on November 19, 1944. Incident location: Hungary.

Graduating Cadet Class - Single Engine Section - SE-43-B - February 16, 1943
 2nd Lt Walter M. Downs
 2nd Lt Claude B. Govan
 2nd Lt William E. Griffin
 2nd Lt James R. Polkinghorne, declared missing in action on May 5, 1944; plane and body never found 
 2nd Lt John H. Prowell, declared dead after missing in action April 25, 1944 from convoy patrol 30 miles SSW La Cosa
 2nd Lt Roy M. Spencer

Graduating Cadet Class - Single Engine Section - SE-43-C - March 25, 1943
 2nd Lt. Clarence W. Allen
 2nd Lt. Leroy Bowman
 2nd Lt. Woodrow Crockett listed as Woodrow W. Crockett
 2nd Lt. Alfonza W. Davis
 2nd Lt. Lawrence Dickson listed as Lawrence E. Dickson
 2nd Lt. Alwayne M. Dunlap, killed on February 21, 1944, when his aircraft overshot a landing strip on a beachhead in Anzio, Italy, crashing.
 2nd Lt. Elmer A. Gordon
 2nd Lt. William M. Gordon
 2nd Lt. Clarence F. Jamerson
 2nd Lt. Walter L. McCreary
 2nd Lt. Pearlee E. Sanders
 2nd Lt. Wilmeth Sidat-Singh
 2nd Lt. Lloyd G. Singletary

Graduating Cadet Class - Single Engine Section - SE-43-D - April 29, 1943
 2nd Lt. Paul Adams
 2nd Lt. Charles P. Bailey (Pilot)
 2nd Lt. James E. Brothers
 2nd Lt. James Y. Carter
 2nd Lt. Arnold W. Cisco, killed on May 19, 1946, when his transport plane hit power lines during a storm, crashing near Tuskegee, Alabama 
 2nd Lt. Wilson V. Eagleson
 2nd Lt. William J. Faulkner, presumed dead after crashing over Austria on November 6, 1944 
 2nd Lt. Walter T. Foreman
 2nd Lt. Vernon V. Haywood 
 2nd Lt. Heber C. Houston
 2nd Lt. Freddie E. Hutchins
 2nd Lt. Leonard M. Jackson
 2nd Lt. Sidney J. Mosley
 2nd Lt. Curtis C. Robinson
 2nd Lt. Harold E. Sawyer
 2nd Lt. Lewis C. Smith
 2nd Lt. Ulysses S. Taylor
 2nd Lt. Luke J. Weathers
 2nd Lt. Charles L. Williams

Graduating Cadet Class - Single Engine Section - SE-43-E - May 28, 1943
 2nd Lt John F. Briggs
 2nd Lt Milton R Brooks
 2nd Lt Charles M. Bussey
 2nd Lt Spurgeon N. Ellington
 2nd Lt Maurice V. Esters, declared dead after forced to bail from his plane over the Adriatic Sea when his engine failed on June 26, 1944 
 2nd Lt Clemenceau M. Giving, drowned in Naples Harbor in Italy on March 18, 1944, after bailing from mechanically failing aircraft; became tangled in his parachute causing him to drown; body recovered by an Italian fisherman 
 2nd Lt Joseph P. Gomer
 2nd Lt George E Gray, killed April 5, 1951 in Pyongyang, North Korea during a combat aerial firing pass at extremely close range; aircraft struck the ground, exploded and disintegrated. 
 2nd Lt John L. Hamilton
 2nd Lt Langdon E. Johnson, killed on August 12, 1944, when his aircraft was hit by flak after strafing enemy radar stations at Marseilles, France; crashed into sea 
 2nd Lt Felix J. Kirkpatrick
 2nd Lt Albert H. Manning
 2nd Lt Oliver O. Miller
 2nd Lt Dempsey W. Morgan
 2nd Lt Harry A. Sheppard 
 2nd Lt Luther H. Smith 
 2nd Lt John J. Suggs
 2nd Lt James A. Walker

Graduating Cadet Class - Single Engine Section - SE-43-F - June 30, 1943
 2nd Lt. Robert R. Alexander
 2nd Lt. Alexander M. Bright
 2nd Lt. Weldon K. Groves 
 2nd Lt. Charles McGee (Tuskegee Airman) listed as Charles E McGee
 2nd Lt. Herbert S Harris
 2nd Lt. Richard H. Harris
 2nd Lt. Milton R. Henry
 2nd Lt. Willie S. Hunter
 2nd Lt. Wilbert H. Johnson
 2nd Lt. Oscar A. Kenney, killed in action, son of prominent physician, John A. Kenney Sr. 
 2nd Lt. Lacy Hezekiah
 2nd Lt. Joe A. Lewis

Graduating Cadet Class - Single Engine Section - SE-43-G - July 28, 1943
 2nd Lt. Lee Archer
 2nd Lt. Harry L. Bailey
 2nd Lt. William Bartley (pilot)
 2nd Lt. Raymond Cassagnol, Haitian cadet
 2nd Lt. Samuel L. Curtis
 2nd Lt. John Daniels
 2nd Lt. William B. Ellis
 2nd Lt. William W. Green Jr. 
 2nd Lt. George B. Greenlee Jr
 2nd Lt. Richard W. Hall (“Dopey” Hall). Not to be confused with DOTA Richard Hall, Chief Master Sergeant 
 2nd Lt. Jack D Holsclaw
 2nd Lt. Daniel "Chappie" James Jr. listed as Daniel James Jr. 
 2nd Lt. John H. Leahr
 2nd Lt. Claybourne A. Lockett
 2nd Lt. James W. Mason
 2nd Lt. Eddie McLaurin
 2nd Lt. William R. Melton
 2nd Lt. Robert H Nelson
 2nd Lt. Maurice R. Page
 2nd Lt. G. Rogers
 2nd Lt. Edward M. Smith
 2nd Lt. Lowell Steward listed as Lowell C. Steward
 2nd Lt. Edward W. Taylor
 2nd Lt. Alva Temple
 2nd Lt. Walter D. Westmoreland, killed on October 13, 1944; plane shot down by enemy ground fire near Lake Balaton, Hungary 
 2nd Lt. Robert H. Wiggins, killed during escort mission to Vienna, Austria oil refinery on Oct. 7, 1944; plane hit by anti-aircraft fire; eventually crashed in the Adriatic Sea. 
 2nd Lt. LeRoi S. Williams, killed in mid-air collision with 2nd Lt William H. Walker on October 14, 1943, near Selfridge Field, Michigan; brother of Tuskegee Airmen cadet graduate Eugene Williams 
 2nd Lt. Beryl Wyatt, killed April 18, 1944 when his plane crashed after an attempted landing.

Graduating Cadet Class - Single Engine Section - SE-43-H - August 30, 1943
 2nd Lt Alton F Ballard
 2nd Lt Hubron R. Blackwell
 2nd Lt Everett A. Bratcher
 2nd Lt Harry J. Daniels, declared dead after non-hostile aerial crash in Italy on May 18, 1945. 
 2nd Lt Andrew H. Doswell
 2nd Lt Charles A. Dunne
 2nd Lt Smith W. Green
 2nd Lt William E. Hill
 2nd Lt Lawrence B. Jefferson
 2nd Lt Samuel Jefferson, presumed dead after aircraft crashed near Corsica on June 24, 1944. 
 2nd Lt Hubert L. Jones
 2nd Lt William B. McClenic Jr.
 Alix Pasquet, Haitian Cadet
 2nd Lt Starling B. Penn
 2nd Lt Leon Purchase
 2nd Lt Roger Romine
 2nd Lt Norvel Stoudmire, killed March 31, 1944, when his parachute got snagged after his plane caught fire during a harbor patrol mission in Italy. 
 2nd Lt Charles W. Tate
 2nd Lt George A. Taylor
 2nd Lt Floyd A. Thompson
 2nd Lt Carroll S. Woods
 2nd Lt Willard L. Woods

Graduating Cadet Class - CL-43-1 - Liaison Pilot - September 30, 1943
 2nd Lt Darryl C. Bishop
 2nd Lt Harry W. Dungill
 2nd Lt Charles Dunn
 1st Lt Chauncey Eskridge
 2nd Lt Arnold D. Grant
 2nd Lt Leander A. Hall Jr.
 1st Lt James I. Minor, Jr.
 2nd Lt Benjamin F. Moore
 1st Lt William Y. Rose
 Capt. William H. Shannon
 2nd Lt Lloyd R. V. Taylor
 2nd Lt Leonard E. Wilburn
 2nd Lt Adlrick H. Wilson
 2nd Lt James E. Woodson

Graduating Cadet Class - Single Engine Section - SE-43-I - October 1, 1943
 2nd Lt William N. Alsbrook
 2nd Lt Cecil L. Browder
 2nd Lt Gene C. Browne
 Flight Officer William Cross, Jr.
 2nd Lt Purnell J. Goodenough
 2nd Lt George Haley
 2nd Lt Maceo A. Harris Jr., declared dead after air crash in Germany on November 20, 1944. 
 2nd Lt Carl E Johnson, Not to be confused with Tuskegee Airman Flight Officer Carl C. Johnson of Cadet Class 46-C - October 1946 
 2nd Lt Charles B. Johnson, declared dead after air crash in Mediterranean Sea on June 24, 1944. 
 2nd Lt Edgar L. Jones, declared dead after air crash in Italy on April 24, 1944. 
 2nd Lt Carroll N. Langston, killed after crashing into sea in Italy on June 7, 1944. 
 2nd Lt Cornelius F. May
 2nd Lt Woodrow F. Morgan
 2nd Lt Neal V. Nelson, presumed dead when aircraft encountered flak in Italy on May 11, 1944. 
 2nd Lt Christopher W. Newman
 2nd Lt Driskell B. Ponder
 2nd Lt George M. Rhodes, Jr.
 2nd Lt Washington D. Ross
 2nd Lt Norman W. Scales
 2nd Lt Henry B. Scott
 2nd Lt Alphonso Simmons, killed by anti-aircraft fire on March 3, 1945, in Austria after shooting two parked German planes. 
 2nd Lt Robert H. Smith
 2nd Lt Edward W. Watkins

Graduating Cadet Class - Liaison Pilot Section - CL-43-2 - October 22, 1943
 2nd Lt Henry Bennet, 
 2nd Lt George F. Bizzell
 1st Lt Terry H. Brooks
 2nd Lt Richard C. Chatman Jr.
 2nd Lt William J. Cleveland
 2nd Lt John O. Cunningham
 1st Lt John B. Dudley
 1st Lt Gaines C. Farley
 2nd Lt John M. Franklin
 2nd Lt Louis K. Hanks
 1st Lt Fred E. Howard
 2nd Lt William M. Jordan
 2nd Lt Thurston Mason
 2nd Lt John E. McCode
 1st Lt. Leroy Stephens Jr.
 2nd Lt Daniel C. Thomas
 2nd Lt Paul Weathersby
 1st Lt Robert L. Wrenn

Graduating Cadet Class - Single Engine Section - SE-43-J - November 3, 1943
 Brown, 2nd Lt James B
 2nd Lt Roger B. Brown, killed June 14, 1944; P-47 crashed during a training mission 
 2nd Lt Herman A. Campbell
 2nd Lt Clarence Dart listed as Clarence W. Dart
 Carroll, 2nd Lt Alfred Q., Jr.
 2nd Lt Charles W. Dickerson
 2nd Lt Henry F. Fletcher
 2nd Lt Perry E. Hudson Jr.
 2nd Lt Oscar D. Hutton
 2nd Lt Haldane King
 2nd Lt Edward Laird
 Leftwich, 2nd Lt Ivey L.
 2nd Lt Vincent J. Mason
 2nd Lt Theodore H Mills
 2nd Lt Turner W. Payne
 2nd Lt Gwynne W. Peirson
 2nd Lt Harvey N. Pinkney
 Flight Officer Nathaniel P. Rayburg
 2nd Lt Emory L. Robbins Jr. 
 Sherard, 2nd Lt Earl S., Jr.
 2nd Lt Paul J. Simmons Jr. 
 2nd Lt Eugene Smith (aviator) listed as Eugene D. Smith
 2nd Lt Jerome D. Spurlin
 2nd Lt Nathaniel C. Stewart
 2nd Lt Edward H. Thomas 
 2nd Lt William M. Thomas
 2nd Lt William D. Tompkins
 2nd Lt Hugh St. Clair Warner
 2nd Lt Leslie A Williams

Graduating Cadet Class - Single Engine Section - SE-43-K - December 3, 1943
 2nd Lt Edgar L. Bolden
 2nd Lt Clarence H. Bradford
 2nd Lt Robert H. Daniels, Jr.
 2nd Lt Othell Dickson
 2nd Lt Robert Friend listed as Robert J. Friend
 2nd Lt Fredrick D. Funderburg
 2nd Lt Howard C. Gamble
 2nd Lt Stanley L Harris
 2nd Lt Lloyd S. Hatchcock
 Flight Officer William Lee Hill listed as William L. Hill, shot down twice and credited with one aerial victory
 2nd Lt Lloyd S. Hatchcock
 2nd Lt Wellington G. Irving
 2nd Lt Clarence D. Lester
 2nd Lt William R. Lewis
 2nd Lt Henry Pollard
 2nd Lt Reid E. Thompson
 Flight Officer Edward J. Williams

Graduating Cadet Class - Twin Engine Section - TE-43-K - December 3, 1943
 2nd Lt Samuel A. Black Jr.
 2nd Lt Harold E. Brazil
 2nd Lt William L. Byrd Jr. 
 2nd Lt Eugene Calvin Cheatham Jr. listed as "Eugene C. Cheatham Jr."
 2nd Lt Stewart B. Fullbright Jr.
 2nd Lt John L. Harrison Jr
 2nd Lt Henry P. Hervey Jr.
 2nd Lt Richard B. Highbaugh
 2nd Lt Harold A. Hillard
 1st Lt. Elmore V. Kennedy
 2nd Lt Samuel L. Lynn
 1st Lt. Fitzroy Newsum
 Flight Officer Amos A. Rogers
 2nd Lt Wendell D. Wells
 2nd Lt Joseph D. Whiten

Graduating Cadet Class - CL-43-3 - Liaison Pilot Section - December 7, 1943
 1st Lt Lee Arthur Baker
 2nd Lt. John D. Battle
 2nd Lt. Edward W. Brice
 2nd Lt. Johnny Y. Brooks
 1st Lt Scott K. Cleage
 2nd Lt. George D. Conquest
 2nd Lt. Charles B. Elam
 2nd Lt. Ernest W. Goldsborough
 2nd Lt. Maxwell Honemond
 2nd Lt. Sterling K. Jackson
 2nd Lt. William H. Johnson
 2nd Lt. Wendell W. Long
 2nd Lt. Henry A. Norman
 2nd Lt. Horace W. Oates
 2nd Lt. Elwood A Smith
 2nd Lt. Sherman W. Smith
 2nd Lt. Lemuel L. Tucker
 2nd Lt. George Woods

Graduating Cadet Class - Single Engine Section - SE-44-A - January 7, 1944
 Flight Officer Clarence N. Driver, Missing in Action in Laos on 7 March 1973.   
 2nd Lt Charles H. Duke 
 2nd Lt Charles S. Jackson, Jr.
 2nd Lt Alexander Jefferson 
 2nd Lt Robert Martin (aviator) listed as Robert L. Martin
 2nd Lt Frederick D. McIver, Jr.
 2nd Lt Robert O'Neil 
 2nd Lt Sanford M. Perkins
 2nd Lt Frank E. Roberts
 2nd Lt Arthur J. Wilburn

Graduating Cadet Class -Twin Engine Section TE-44-A - January 7, 1944
 2nd Lt Elliot H. Blue
 2nd Lt Rolin A. Bynum
 Flight Officer Virgil A. Daniels
 2nd Lt Samuel L. Harper
 2nd Lt Kenneth R. Hawkins
 2nd Lt Charles H. Hunter
 2nd Lt Andrea P. Masciana
 2nd Lt Frederick L. Parker, Jr.
 2nd Lt William A. Rucker
 2nd Lt Leon L. Turner
 Flight Officer Saint M. Twine, Jr.
 2nd Lt Charles Walker
 Flight Officer Clarence Walker
 2nd Lt Herbert W. Williams
 2nd Lt Eugene Winslow

Graduating Cadet Class - Single Engine Section - SE-44-K - February 1, 1944
 2nd Lt Montro D Askins
 2nd Lt Lloyd W Bell
 Flight Officer Richard L. Biffle, Jr.
 2nd Lt James E. Bowman
 2nd Lt Lawrence A. Brown
 2nd Lt Lloyd A.N. Carter
 2nd Lt Lowell H. Cleaver
 2nd Lt William A. Colbert, Jr.
 2nd Lt Charles E. Craig
 2nd Lt Joshua Glenn
 2nd Lt Percy Heath listed as Percy L Heath Jr.
 2nd Lt William T. Henry
 2nd Lt William H. Hymes
 2nd Lt Beecher A. Jones
 2nd Lt Robert O. Merriweather
 2nd Lt Ephraim E. Toatley Jr.

Graduating Cadet Class - Twin Engine Section - TE-44-K -February 1, 1944
 2nd Lt Rayfield A. Anderson
 Flight Officer Grover Crunnbsy
 Flight Officer Oliver Goodall listed as Ollie O. Goodall Jr.
 2nd Lt Archie H.Harris, Jr.
 2nd Lt Mitchell Higginbotham listed as Mitchell L. Higginbotham
 2nd Lt Roger Terry Listed as Roger C. Terry
 Flight Officer Haydel J. White

Graduating Cadet Class - Single Engine Section - SE-44-C - February 8, 1944
 Ludovic F. Audant, Haitian Cadet
 2nd Lt Thomas P. Braswell
 2nd Lt Robert C. Chandler
 2nd Lt Emile G. Clifton
 2nd Lt Roger B. Gaiter
 2nd Lt Thomas L. Gay
 2nd Lt Joseph E. Gordon
 2nd Lt Alfred Gorham, listed as Alfred M. Gorham
 Flight Officer Cornelius P. Gould Jr.
 2nd Lt Richard S. Harder
 2nd Lt Wilbur F. Long
 2nd Lt Richard D. Macon
 2nd Lt Frank H. Moody, killed April 11, 1944 on a training mission over Lake Huron in Michigan; plane found 70 years later. 
 2nd Lt Thomas G. Patton
 2nd Lt Marion Rodgers Listed as Marion R. Rodgers
 2nd Lt Shelby F. Westbrook
 2nd Lt Cohen M. White
 Flight Officer Leonard R. Willette
 2nd Lt Kenneth I. Williams
 2nd Lt Henry Wise Jr. Listed as Henry A. Wise

Graduating Cadet Class - Twin Engine Section - TE-44-C -February 8, 1944
 2nd Lt Winston A. Adkins
 2nd Lt Charles W. Diggs
 2nd Lt William H. Farley
 2nd Lt. Frederick P. Hicks
 2nd Lt Charles D. Hill
 1st Lt. Louis G. Hill, Jr.
 2nd Lt George B. Matthews
 Pellissier C.	Nicholas (Haitian Cadet)

Graduating Cadet Class - Single Engine Section - SE-44-C - March 12, 1944
 2nd Lt Fred L. Brewer, Jr., declared dead after P-51C Mustang “Traveling Light” experienced engine trouble, went down October 20, 1944 over Germany.  
 2nd Lt Roscoe Brown listed as Roscoe C. Brown
 2nd Lt Walter R. Brown Jr.
 2nd Lt James A. Calhoun
 2nd Lt Vincent C. Dean
 2nd Lt James L. Hall Jr.
 2nd Lt Herbert H. Heywood
 2nd Lt Elbert Hudson
 2nd Lt Andrew D Marshall
 2nd Lt Rixie H. McCarroll
 2nd Lt Joseph L. Merton, Jr.
 2nd Lt Elton H. Nightingale
 2nd Lt John H. Porter
 2nd Lt William S. Price, III
 2nd Lt Gordon M. Rapier
 2nd Lt Henry E. Rohlsen
 2nd Lt Roosevelt Stiger
 2nd Lt William M. Wheeler
 2nd Lt Charles L. White
 2nd Lt Albert L. Young

Graduating Cadet Class - Twin Engine Section - TE-44-C - March 12, 1944
 2nd Lt Charles E. Darnell
 2nd Lt Reginald W. Hayes
 1st Lt Payton H. Lyle
 2nd Lt Ahmed A. Rayner, Jr.
 Flight Officer Charles E. Wilson

Graduating Cadet Class - Single Engine Section - SE-44-D - April 15, 1944
 2nd Lt Barnes, Gentry E.
 Flight Officer Bell, Raul W.
 2nd Lt Chavis, John H.
 2nd Lt Cox, Hannibal M.
 2nd Lt Craig, Lewis W.
 2nd Lt Hays, Milton S.
 Flight Officer Jackson, Charles L.
 2nd Lt Jones, Major E.
 2nd Lt Lane, Earl R.
 2nd Lt Walter Manning listed as Walter P. Manning
 Flight Officer Mitchell, Vincent I.
  2nd Lt Moody, Roland W.
 2nd Lt Morris, Harold M.
  2nd Lt Peoples, Francis B.
 2nd Lt Peoples, Henry R..
 2nd Lt Rich, Daniel L.
 2nd Lt Turner, Ralph L.
 2nd Lt Wheeler, Jimmie D.
 Flight Officer Williams, Vincent E.
 2nd Lt Wilson, James A.
 Flight Officer Wilson, Myron
 Flight Officer Woods, Carl J.

Graduating Cadet Class - Twin Engine Section - TE-44-D - April 15, 1944
 2nd Lt Alexander, Harvey R.
 2nd Lt Anderson, Robert D.
 2nd Lt Brashears, Virgil
 2nd Lt Coleman, William C.
 Flight Officer Cook, Martin L.
 2nd Lt Cousins, August, Jr.
 Eberle J. Guilbaud
 2nd Lt King, Celestus
 2nd Lt Kydd, George H., III
 2nd Lt Moody, Paul L.
 2nd Lt Shults, Lloyd R.

Graduating Cadet Class - Single Engine Section - SE-44-E - May 23, 1944
 2nd Lt. Richard H. Bell
 2nd Lt. Leonelle A. Bonam
 Flight Officer Charles V. Brantley
 2nd Lt. Harold H. Brown (Tuskegee Airman) listed as Harold E. Brown
 2nd Lt. Joseph E. Chineworth
 2nd Lt. George E. Cisco
 2nd Lt. Harry J. Davenport Jr.
 2nd Lt. John W. Davis
 Flight Officer Samuel J. Foreman
 Flight Officer Thomas L. Hawkins
 2nd Lt. George K. Hays
 2nd Lt. Maycie Herrington listed as Arron Herrington
 2nd Lt. Earl B. Highbaugh
 2nd Lt. Wendell W. Hockaday
 2nd Lt. George J. Iles
 Flight Officer Thomas W. Jefferson
 2nd Lt. Jimmy Lanham
 1st Lt. Wendell M. Lucas
 2nd Lt. Clarence A. Oliphant
 2nd Lt. Ralph Orduna
 Flight Officer Robert A. Pillow
 Flight Officer James C. Ramsey
 2nd Lt. Leroy Roberts Jr.
 Flight Officer Arnett W. Starks Jr.
 2nd Lt. William C. Walker Jr
 2nd Lt. Samuel W. Watts Jr.
 2nd Lt. Robert W. Williams
 2nd Lt. Bertram W. Wilson Jr.
 Flight Officer Hiram Wright
 2nd Lt. Kenneth M. Wright

Graduating Cadet Class - Single Engine Section - SE-44-F - June 27, 1944
 Flight Officer Richard S. A. Armistead
 2nd Lt Carl F. Ellis
 2nd Lt Charles A. Hill Jr.
 2nd Lt Lincoln Hudson listed as Lincoln T. Hudson
 2nd Lt Rupert C. Johnson
 2nd Lt Lawrence, Robert W.
 2nd Lt James W. Wright Jr. 
 Flight Officer George A. Lynch
 2nd Lt Lewis J. Lynch
 2nd Lt Hiram Mann listed as Hiram E. Mann
 Flight Officer James T. Mitchell Jr.
 Flight Officer Robert J. Murdic
 Flight Officer Wyrain T. Schell
 Flight Officer Leon W. Spears
 2nd Lt Harry Stewart, Jr. listed as Harry T. Stewart Jr.
 Flight Officer Samuel L. Washington
 2nd Lt Hugh J. White
 Flight Officer Yenwith K. Whitney
 2nd Lt Frank N. Wright
 2nd Lt James W. Wright Jr.

Graduating Cadet Class -Twin Engine Section -TE-44-F - June 27, 1944
 Flight Officer James Ewing
 Flight Officer William T Jackson
 2nd Lt Laurel E. Keith
 2nd Lt Frank Lee
 Flight Officer John R. Perkins Jr.
 2nd Lt John B. Turner
 2nd Lt Rhohelia J. Webb

Graduating Cadet Class - Single Engine Section - SE-44-G - August 4, 1944
 2nd Lt. George L. Bing
 Flight Officer John Ellis Edwards listed as John E. Edwards
 Flight Officer William H. Edwards
 Fischer, Flight Officer James H.
 Flight Officer Thurston L. Gaines, Jr.
 2nd Lt. Robert E. Garrison, Jr.
 2nd Lt. Flight Officer Newman C. Golden
 2nd Lt. Leo R. Gray
 2nd Lt. Paul L. Green
 2nd Lt. Conrad A. Johnson, Jr.
 2nd Lt. Benny R. Kimbrough
 Flight Officer John Lyle (pilot) (listed as John H. Lyle)
 Flight Officer Elbert N. Merriweather, Jr
 Flight Officer Leland H. Pennington
 2nd Lt. Ronald W. Reeves
 Flight Officer Maury M. Reid
 Flight Officer William E. Rice
 2nd Lt. Robert C. Robinson, Jr.
 Flight Officer Calvin J. Spann
 2nd Lt. Thomas C. Street
 2nd Lt. Harry L. White
 Flight Officer Joseph C. White
 Flight Officer Robert E. Williams, Jr.

Graduating Cadet Class - Twin Engine Section - TE-44-G - August 4, 1944
 Flight Officer James E. Brothers
 2nd Lt. Harold Howard Brown
 2nd Lt. Reginald Bruce
 1st Lt. Claude C. Davis
 2nd Lt. Edward T. Dixon
 Flight Officer Edward Harris
 Flight Officer Willard B. Miller
 2nd Lt. John Mosley listed as John William Mosley
 Flight Officer Ramon F. Noches
 Flight Officer Maurice D. Pompey
 Flight Officer Charles J. Quander Jr. 
 Flight Officer Harris H. Robnett, Jr.
 Flight Officer James H. Sheppard
 Flight Officer Jesse H. Simpson

Graduating Cadet Class - Single Engine Section - SE-44-H - September 8, 1944
 Anders, 2nd Lt. Emet R.
 Flight Officer William Armstrong
 Barland, 2nd Lt. Herbert C.
 Carey, 2nd Lt. Carl E.
 Coleman, 2nd Lt. James
 Cooper, Flight Officer Charles W.
 Cousins, 2nd Lt. William M.
 Franklin, 2nd Lt. George E.
 Gant, Flight Officer Morris E.
 2nd Lt. George Hardy (Tuskegee Airman) listed as George E. Hardy
 2nd Lt. William H. Holloman
 Jenkins, 2nd Lt. Stephen S., Jr.
 Johnson, Flight Officer Robert M.
 Flight Officer Charles A. Lane
 2nd Lt. Samuel G. Leftenant, 
 Lieteau, 1st Lt Albert J.
 Manley, Flight Officer Edward E.
 Matthews, Flight Officer Samuel
 McCrory, 2nd Lt. Felix M.
 Miller, Flight Officer Lawrence I.
 Squires, Flight Officer John W.
 Washington, Flight Officer Milton S.
 2nd Lt. John L. Whitehead Jr.

Graduating Cadet Class - Twin Engine Section - TE-44-H - September 8, 1944
 Bonseigneur, 2nd Lt. Paul J., Jr.
 Brown, 2nd Lt. Augustus G.
 Brown, 2nd Lt. Robert S.
 Goodwin, 1st Lt Luther A.
 Henry, Warren E.
 Hurd, 1st Lt James A.
 Nalle, Flight Officer Russell C., Jr.
 Rector, 1st Lt John A.
 Samuels, Flight Officer Frederick H.

Graduating Cadet Class - Single Engine Section - SE-44-I-1 - October 16, 1944
 2nd Lt. Rutherford H. Adkins
 Daniels, Flight Officer Thomas J., III
 Doram, 2nd Lt. Edward D.
 Dowling, 2nd Lt. Corneilus D.
 Glass, Flight Officer Robert M.
 2nd Lt. James H. Harvey
 Hunter, 2nd Lt. Henry A.
 Jackson, Flight Officer Frank A.
 Lancaster, 2nd Lt. Theadore W.
 Miller, 2nd Lt. Charles E.
 Millett, 2nd Lt. Joseph H.
 Myers, 2nd Lt. Charles P.
 Simons, 2nd Lt. Richard A.
 Stevens, 2nd Lt. Richard G.
 Stovall, 2nd Lt. Charles L
 Thompson, 2nd Lt. Donald N., Jr.
 Thorpe, 2nd Lt. Richard E.
 Turner, 2nd Lt. Allen H.
 Warren, Flight Officer James W.
 White, 2nd Lt. Ferrier H

Graduating Cadet Class - Twin Engine Section - TE-44-I-1 - October 16, 1944
 Anderson, 1st Lt Paul T.
 Brown, 2nd Lt. James W.
 Cain, Flight Officer William L.
 Chinchester, 2nd Lt. James R.
 Collins, Flight Officer Gamaliel M.
 Drummond, 2nd Lt. Charles H., Jr.
 Exum, Flight Officer Herven P.
 Green, Flight Officer James L.
 Jenkins, 2nd Lt. Joseph E.
 Jenkins, 2nd Lt. Silas M.
 Mason, 2nd Lt. Theodore O.
 Maxwell, Flight Officer Charles C.
 Murphy, Flight Officer David J.
 Pullian, Flight Officer Glen W.
 Smith, 1st Lt Harold E.

Graduating Cadet Class - Single Engine Section - SE-44-I - November 20, 1944
 2nd Lt Halbert L. Alexander 
 2nd Lt William R. Alston
 Flight Officer John J. Bell
 2nd Lt Irvin O. Brewin
 Flight Officer Julius W. Calloway
 Flight Officer Tamenund J. Dickerson Jr.
 2nd Lt Thomas Gladden
 Flight Officer Vernon Hopson
 2nd Lt Garfield L. Jenkins
 2nd Lt Alvin J. Johnson
 2nd Lt Andrew Johnson Jr. 
 2nd Lt Louis W. Johnson
 2nd Lt Willis E. Moore
 Flight Officer Calvin G. Moret
 2nd Lt Lincoln W. Nelson
 2nd Lt Eugene G. Theodore
 Flight Officer Leonard O. Vaughan
 Flight Officer Reginald C. Waddell
 2nd Lt William M. Washington
 2nd Lt Ralph D. Wilkins

Graduating Cadet Class - Twin Engine Section - TE-44-I - November 20, 1944
 Fears, Flight Officer Henry T.
 2nd Lt Bernard R. Harris 
 Hawkins, Flight Officer Donald A.
 2nd Lt Eugene R. Henderson
 2nd Lt Voris S. James
 Flight Officer Charles A. Johnson
 McQuillan, Flight Officer Douglas H.
 Flight Officer Robert M. Parkey
 2nd Lt James V. Stevenson
 Flight Officer Wayman P. Surcey
 Flight Officer Morris J. Washington 
 Flight Officer Raymond M. White
 2nd Lt James W. Whyte Jr.
 2nd Lt Joseph H. Williams
 2nd Lt Oscar H. York

Graduating Cadet Class - Single Engine Section - SE-44-J - December 28, 1944
 Bohannon, Flight Officer Horace A.
 Flight Officer Henry Cabot Lodge Bohler
 Bryant, Flight Officer Leroy, Jr.
 Burns, 2nd Lt. Isham A., Jr.
 Campbell, Flight Officer Lindsey L.
 Campbell, 2nd Lt. McWheeler
 Cole, Flight Officer Robert A.
 Dickson, Flight Officer DeWitt
 Greer, Flight Officer James W.
 Guyton, Flight Officer Eugene L.
 Harris, 2nd Lt. James E.
 Kirksey, Flight Officer LeeRoy
 Nelson, Flight Officer Dempsey, Jr.
 Parker, Flight Officer Melvin
 Pendleton, 2nd Lt. Frederick
 Shivers, Flight Officer Clarence L.
 Smith, Flight Officer Thomas W.
 Stephenson, Flight Officer William W., Jr.
 1st Lt Yancey Williams
 Williamson, Flight Officer Willie A.

Graduating Cadet Class - Twin Engine Section - TE-44-J - December 28, 1944
 Allen, Flight Officer Walter H.
 Cowan, Flight Officer Edwin T.
 Edwards, Flight Officer James E., Jr.
 Flake, Flight Officer Thomas M.
 Herron, 1st Lt Walter E.
 Hunter, 2nd Lt. Samuel D.
 McRae, 2nd Lt. Ivan J., Jr.
 Moore, Flight Officer Flarzell
 Flight Officer John Ira Mulzac
 Qualles, Flight Officer John P.
 2nd Lt. Lawrence E. Roberts 
 Velasquez, Flight Officer Frederick B.
 Williams, Flight Officer William L., Jr.
 Wooten, Flight Officer Howard A.
 Wynn, Flight Officer Nasby, Jr.

Graduating Cadet Class - Single Engine Section - SE-45-A - March 11, 1945
 Flight Officer Luzine B. Bickham
 Flight Officer Broadnax, Samuel L.
 2nd Lt John Albert Burch III
 2nd Lt Emest M. Cabule Jr.
 2nd Lt Vincent O. Campbell
 2nd Lt William J. Coleman
 Flight Officer Edgar A. Doswell Jr.
 2nd Lt Clarence C. Finley
 2nd Lt Joseph E. Gash
 2nd Lt Bertrand J. Holbert
 2nd Lt Edward M. Jenkins
 Flight Officer Robert Jones Jr.
 Flight Officer Wilbur Moffett
 2nd Lt Thomas J. Morrison Jr.
 Flight Officer Harry S. Pruitt
 2nd Lt Marsille P. Reed
 2nd Lt Clayo C. Rice 
 2nd Lt Eugene J. Richardson Jr.
 2nd Lt Spencer M. Robinson
 2nd Lt Albert H. Smith
 2nd Lt John B. Walker Jr.
 Flight Officer Harry P. Winston

Graduating Cadet Class - Twin Engine Section - TE-45-A - March 11, 1945
 2nd Lt Melvin A. Clayton
 2nd Lt Hemdon M. Cummings
 Flight Officer William J. Curtis Jr.
 2nd Lt Charles J. Dorkins
 Flight Officer Rutledge H. Fleming Jr.
 Flight Officer Charles S. Goldsby
 2nd Lt Argonne F. Harden
 2nd Lt James V. Kennedy Jr.
 Flight Officer Harvey L. McClelland
 Flight Officer Alfred U. McKenzie
 2nd Lt Luther L. Oliver
 2nd Lt Herbert J. Schwing
 2nd Lt Quentin P. Smith
 2nd Lt Francis R Thompson
 2nd Lt Cleophus W. Valentine
 2nd Lt Calvin T. Warrick

Graduating Cadet Class - Single Engine Section - SE-45-B - April 15, 1945
 2nd Lt. John H. Adams Jr.
 2nd Lt. Clarence Bee, Jr
 Brooks, Flight Officer Tilford U.
 Casey, Flight Officer Clifton G.
 Curtis, 2nd Lt. John W.
 Dudley, 2nd Lt. Richard 
 Gilliam, Flight Officer William L.
 Henson, 2nd Lt. James W.
 Hughes, Flight Officer Samuel R., Jr.
 Knight, Flight Officer William H.
 Long, Flight Officer Clyde C., Jr.
 Patton, Flight Officer Humprey C., Jr
 Payne, Flight Officer Verdelle L.
 Pennington, Flight Officer Robert F.
 Porter, Flight Officer Robert B.
 Powell, Flight Officer William S., Jr.
 Purnell, Flight Officer George B.
 Radcliffe, 2nd Lt. Lloyd L.
 Sheats, 2nd Lt. George H.
 Smith, 2nd Lt. Burl E.
 Tucker, Flight Officer Paul
 Winslow, 2nd Lt. Robert W.
 Winston, Flight Officer Charles H., Jr.

Graduating Cadet Class - Twin Engine Section - TE-45-B - April 15, 1945
 Flight Officer Leroy Criss
 Desvignes, Flight Officer Russell F.
 Freeman, Flight Officer Eldridge E.
 Johnson, 2nd Lt. Theopolis W.
 Jordon, 2nd Lt. Lowell H.
 Norton, Flight Officer George G., Jr.
 Taylor, Flight Officer James E.

Graduating Cadet Class - Single Engine Section - SE-45-C - May 23, 1945
 Bailey, Flight Officer Terry C.
 Clayter, 2nd Lt. Ralph V.
 Franklin, 2nd Lt. Earl N.
 Helem, 2nd Lt. George W.
 Hicks, 2nd Lt. Arthur N.
 Holman, Flight Officer William D.
 Johnson, Flight Officer Earl C.
 Jones, Flight Officer Frank D
 McKnight, 2nd Lt. James W.
 Murray, 2nd Lt. Louis U.
 Parker, 2nd Lt. George J.
 Perkins, 2nd Lt. Roscoe C., Jr.
 Sanderlin, 2nd Lt. Willis E.
 Session, 2nd Lt. Mansfield L.
 Tindall, Flight Officer Thomas J.
 Wanamaker, Flight Officer George E.
 White, Flight Officer Harry W.
 Wofford, 2nd Lt. Kenneth O.
 Young, 2nd Lt. Benjamin, Jr.

Graduating Cadet Class - Twin Engine Section - TE-45-C - May 23, 1945
 Smith, 2nd Lt Frederick D.
 Tyler, 2nd Lt William A., Jr.

Graduating Cadet Class - Single Engine Section - June 4, 1945
Stewart Field, New York
 2nd Lt Earnest J. Davis Jr.

Graduating Cadet Class - Single Engine Section - SE-45-D - June 27, 1945
 2nd Lt. Walter G. Alexander, III
 Bilbo, Flight Officer Reuben B.
 Blaylock, 2nd Lt. Joseph E.
 Bryant, 2nd Lt. Grady E.
 Bryson, Flight Officer James O.
 Carter, Flight Officer Clarence J.
 Cobbs, 2nd Lt. Wilson N.
 Connell, 2nd Lt. Victor L.
 Corbin, Flight Officer Matthew J.
 Francis, Flight Officer William V.
 Giles, Flight Officer Ivie V.
 Hall, 2nd Lt. Leonard C., Jr.
 Harrison, 2nd Lt. James E.
 Johnson, 2nd Lt. Clarence
 Johnston, Flight Officer William A., Jr.
 Kelly, Flight Officer Thomas A.
 Knight, Flight Officer Calvin M.
 Prather, 2nd Lt. George L.
 Prince, 2nd Lt. Joseph A.
 Raymond, Flight Officer Frank R.
 Robinson, 2nd Lt. Robert L., Jr.
 Simeon, Flight Officer Albert B., Jr.
 Smith, Flight Officer Robert C.
 Thomas, Flight Officer Walter H., Jr.
 Trott, 2nd Lt. Robert G.
 Wilhite, 2nd Lt. Emmett J.
 Williams, Flight Officer Raymond L.
 Yates, Flight Officer Phillip C.
 Young, Flight Officer Lee W.

Graduating Cadet Class - Single Engine Section - SE-45-E - August 4, 1945
 Bailey, 2nd Lt William H.
 Barnett, Flight Officer Herman A.
 Collins, Flight Officer Russell L.
 Duncan, 2nd Lt Roger B.
 Flight Officer William A. Fuller Jr. (not to be confused with Willie H. Fuller (listed as Willie Fuller) of Single Engine Section Cadet Class SE-42-G, August 5, 1942
 Gaskins, 2nd Lt Aaron C.
 Holland, Henry T.
 Hurt, 2nd Lt Wesley D.
 McIntyre, 2nd Lt Clinton E.
 Reynolds, Flight Officer Clarence E., Jr.
 Roberts, Flight Officer Logan
 Saunders, 2nd Lt Martin G.
 Scott, 2nd Lt Joseph P.
 Flight Officer Reginald V. Smith
 Turner, 2nd Lt. Gordon G.
 White, Flight Officer Marvin C., Sr.
 Wiggins, Flight Officer Leonard W.
 Williams, 2nd Lt Eugene W.
 Woods, Flight Officer Isaac R.

Graduating Cadet Class - Twin Engine Section - TE-45-E - August 4, 1945
 Broadwater, Flight Officer William E.
 2nd Lt. George L. Brown listed as George A. Brown Jr. 
 Bryant, Flight Officer Joseph C., Jr.
 Choisy, 2nd Lt. George B.
 Curry, 2nd Lt. John C.
 Ford, Flight Officer Harry E., Jr.
 Griffin, Jerrold D.
 Harris, 2nd Lt. John S.
 Maples, Flight Officer Harold B.
 Flight Officer George R. Miller
 Mosley, Flight Officer Clifford E.
 O'Neal, Flight Officer Walter N.
 Prewitt, Flight Officer Mexion O.
 Proctor, Flight Officer Oliver W.
 Roach, Flight Officer John B.
 Taylor, Flight Officer William H., Jr.
 Toney, Flight Officer Mitchel N
 Whiteside, Flight Officer Albert

Graduating Cadet Class - Single Engine Section - SE-45-F - September 8, 1945
 2nd Lt Reuben H. Brown, Jr.
 2nd Lt Walter P. Curry
 2nd Lt Donald F. Davis
 2nd Lt Sylvester S. Davis
 Flight Officer Elliott H. Gray
 2nd Lt Bennett G. Hardy
 2nd Lt Thomas D. Harris, Jr.
 2nd Lt Earl Kelly
 2nd Lt August J. Martin
 2nd Lt Ralph W. Mason
 2nd Lt Herbert A. McIntyre
 2nd Lt William B. Morgan
 2nd Lt Augustus L. Palmer
 Flight Officer Floyd R. Scott Jr.
 Flight Officer Edward W. Watkins
 2nd Lt Julius C. Westmoreland
 Flight Officer James L. Williams
 2nd Lt Thomas E. Williams
 Flight Officer Sandy W. Wright
 2nd Lt William W. Young

Graduating Cadet Class - Twin Engine Section - TE-45-F - September 8, 1945
 Bolden, 2nd Lt George C.
 Cheek, 2nd Lt Quentin V.
 Cooper, 2nd Lt Edward M.
 Dabney, 2nd Lt Roscoe J., Jr
 Davis, Flight Officer Clifford W.
 Finley, Flight Officer Otis E., Jr.
 Hancock, Flight Officer Victor
 Hodges, 2nd Lt Jerry T., Jr.
 Jamison, Flight Officer Donald S.
 Maxwell, 2nd Lt Robert L.
 Mozee, Flight Officer David M., Jr.
 Porter, 2nd Lt Calvin V.
 Ramsey, Flight Officer Pierce T.
 Roach, Flight Officer Charles J.
 Talton, Flight Officer James E.
 Terry, Flight Officer Kenneth E.
 White, 2nd Lt Vertner J., Jr.
 2nd Lt Oscar Lawton Wilkerson Listed as Oscar L. Wilkerson, Jr.
 Wilson, 2nd Lt LeRoy J.

Graduating Cadet Class - Single Engine Section - SE-45-G - October 16, 1945
 Flight Officer Page L. Dickerson
 Flight Officer Alfred E. Garrett Jr.
 Flight Officer Alfonso L. Harris
 2nd Lt Lorenzo W. Holloway Jr.
 Flight Officer Julien D. Jackson Jr.
 2nd Lt William M. Jones
 Flight Officer George Sherman
 Flight Officer James A. Thompson

Graduating Cadet Class - Twin Engine Section - TE-45-G - October 16, 1945
 2nd Lt Granville C. Coggs 
 Flight Officer Julius P. Echols
 2nd Lt Arthur C. Harmon
 Flight Officer Lonnie Harrison
 2nd Lt Marcellus L. Hunter
 Flight Officer Daniel Keel
 2nd Lt William Leslie
 2nd Lt Perry W. Lindsey
 Flight Officer Charles R. Price
 Flight Officer James C. Russell
 2nd Lt Herbert C. Thorpe
 Flight Officer Richard Weatherford
 2nd Lt James R. Williams

Graduating Cadet Class - Single Engine Section - SE-45-H - November 20, 1945
 Flight Officer Sylvester H. Hurd Jr.
 Flight Officer Herbert Lewis Jr.
 2nd Lt Godfrey C. Miller
 2nd Lt Lincoln J. Ragsdale
 2nd Lt Thurman E. Spriggs

Graduating Cadet Class - Twin Engine Section - TE-45-H - November 20, 1945
 2nd Lt Robert Ashby (Tuskegee Airman)
 Flight Officer Henry Baldwin Jr.
 2nd Lt William V. Bibb
 2nd Lt Lawrence W. Carroll
 2nd Lt Jose R. Elfalan
 Flight Officer Nathaniel W. Goins
 Flight Officer Alvin E. Harrison Jr. 
 Flight Officer Lyman L. Hubbard, 
 Flight Officer Donald E. Jackson
 2nd Lt Frederick D. Knight, Jr.
 2nd Lt Joshua J. Lankford
 2nd Lt Llyod B. McKeethen
 Flight Officer John W. Nelson
 Flight Officer Norman E. Proctor
 2nd Lt Nathaniel E. Robinson Jr. 
 2nd Lt Theodore W. Robinson
 Flight Officer Wayman E. Scott
 2nd Lt Cecil Spicer
 Flight Officer William A. Streat Jr.
 Flight Officer Andrew B. Williams Jr.

Graduating Cadet Class - Single Engine Section - SE-45-I - January 29, 1946
 2nd Lt Joseph Bruce Bennett
 Flight Officer Frank Griffin
 2nd Lt Thomas Hamlin McGarrity
  2nd Lt Merrill Ray Ross

Graduating Cadet Class - Twin Engine Section - TE-45-I - January 29, 1946
 2nd Lt. James M. Dillon Jr.
 2nd Lt Oliver M. Dillon
 2nd Lt Everett Ellis
 Flight Officer Lee Archer Hayes
 Flight Officer Donehue Simmons

Graduating Cadet Class - Single Engine Section - SE-46-A - March 23, 1946
 Flight Officer James M. Barksdale
 Flight Officer Eugene A. Briggs
 2nd Lt Jewel B. Butler
 2nd Lt Charles W. Chambers
 2nd Lt James H. Gallwey
 2nd Lt Jacob W. Greenwell
 2nd Lt Harry E. Lanauze
 2nd Lt Thomas W. Love, Jr.

Graduating Cadet Class - Twin Engine Section - TE-46-A - March 23, 1946
 Flight Officer George A. Bates
 Flight Officer Floyd J. Carter
 2nd Lt Charles R. Matthews
 Flight Officer Abe Benjamin Moore

Graduating Cadet Class - Single Engine Section - April 29, 1946
 2nd Lt Andrew A. McCoy Jr.

Graduating Cadet Class - Single Engine Section - SE-46-B - May 14, 1946
 Flight Officer Maceo Conrad Martin Jr.
 Richard Maurice Moss
 Flight Officer Eddie Lee Young

Graduating Cadet Class - Twin Engine Section - TE-46-B - May 14, 1946
 2nd Lt. Charles Aston Burns
 2nd Lt Gene Derricotte, listed as Eugene Andrew Derricotte
 2nd Lt. Ferdinand Albert Hardy
 Flight Officer Andrew James Hughes

Graduating Cadet Class - Single Engine Section - SE-46-C - June 28, 1946
 2nd Lt. Carl V. Allen
 2nd Lt. George E. Bell
 2nd Lt. William G. Carter
 2nd Lt. Conrad H. Cheek
 2nd Lt. Jack Chin
 2nd Lt. Edward P. Drummond
 2nd Lt. Nicholas S. Neblett

Graduating Cadet Class - Twin Engine Section - TE-46-C - June 28, 1946
 2nd Lt. James M. Allison
 2nd Lt. Claude A. Rowe

Graduating Cadet Class 46-C - Twin Engine Section - October 1946
 Flight Officer Carl C. Johnson, Not to be confused with Carl E. Johnson, Oct. 1, 1943 cadet graduate of Class 43-I-SE

Service Pilot Cadet Training - date not documented
 Flight Officer Robert A. Gordon
 Flight Officer Adolph J. Moret Jr.
 Flight Officer James O. Plinton Jr.
 Flight Officer Charles W. Stephens
 Flight Officer Robert Terry
 2nd Lt Archie Williams
 Flight Officer Fred Witherspoon
 Flight Officer James E. Wright

See also
List of Tuskegee Airmen
Executive Order 9981
Military history of African Americans

References 

Tuskegee Airmen
United States Army Air Forces officers
Military personnel from Tuskegee, Alabama
African-American aviators